The Duchesses of Schleswig-Holstein were the consorts of the rulers of Schleswig-Holstein and the separate states of Schleswig and Holstein, before that, the two duchies of Schleswig and Holstein. This article would focus more on the Duchess consorts of Schleswig and Holstein, Schleswig-Holstein (in pretense), and the many branches of the Schleswig-Holstein duchy created by the Danish king for his relatives.

The following list is a list the spouse of the jarls and dukes, who ruled over Schleswig respectively Southern Jutland (Sønderjylland).

Countess consort of Schleswig (Southern Jutland)

Duchess consort of Schleswig (Southern Jutland)

Duchess consort of Schleswig and Holstein

Titular duchess

Duchess of consort Schleswig and Holstein in Gottorp, 1544–1713

Duchess of consort Schleswig and Holstein in Sønderborg, 1544–1668

See also
 List of dukes of Schleswig
 List of rulers of Schleswig-Holstein
 List of Danish consorts
 List of consorts of Oldenburg
 List of consorts of Holstein-Sonderburg
 List of Norwegian queens
 List of Finnish consorts
 List of Swedish consorts

Notes

 Consorts
 Consorts
Lists of duchesses
Denmark history-related lists
Lists of German nobility
Consorts
Consorts